The Oxford University Act 1854 (17 & 18 Vict c 81), sometimes called the Oxford University Reform Act 1854 or the University Reform Act 1854, is an Act of the Parliament of the United Kingdom, which regulates corporate governance at the University of Oxford, England. It established the Hebdomadal Council, the leading body in the university's administration, stating that most members of full-time academic staff were to have voting rights over it.  In the year 2000, the Hebdomadal Council was replaced by the University Council, which is responsible to the Congregation of staff members.

Act
The Oxford University Act 1854 made substantial changes to how Oxford University was run. It established the Hebdomadal Council as the university's governing body; appointed Commissioners to deal with emoluments and variations in historic endowments; and opened the university to students outside the Church of England, as there was no longer a requirement to undergo a theological test or take the Oath of Supremacy. In practice, this allowed many more Scots to attend the university.

In 1850, a parliamentary commission was set up to revise the statutes drawn up by Archbishop William Laud. The original Bill proposed by Lord John Russell was much more limited in scope, however dissenters effectively mobilised, threatening to block the bill, unless the theological tests were dropped.

The reforms curbed the power of heads of colleges, creating a more centralised university authority. Dons no longer had to be in Holy Orders.

Theological tests
The subject of dropping the theological Test was not new as James Heywood described in the parliamentary debate:

See also
 Universities Tests Act 1871

References
Paterson, William (ed). The Practical Statutes of the Session 1854. John Crockford. London. 1854. Pages 126 to 128.
The Oxford University Calendar 1859. Pages 25 to 42.
A Collection of the Public General Statutes, passed in the Seventeenth and Eighteenth Year of the Reign of Her Majesty Queen Victoria. 1854. Pages 276 to 284.

External links
  Text of the Act (as amended)

United Kingdom Acts of Parliament 1854
Law about religion in the United Kingdom
University reform
Reform in England
History of the University of Oxford
University-related legislation
Acts of the Parliament of the United Kingdom concerning England
1854 in England
History of the Church of England